Bishop Anthony Alwyn Fernandes Barreto (born 22 December 1952 in Goa) is the serving bishop of the Roman Catholic Diocese of Sindhudurg.

Early life 
Barreto was born in Goa on 22 December 1952.

Priesthood 
Barreto was ordained a Catholic priest on 13 October 1979 by Bishop Valerian D’Souza.

Episcopate 
He was appointed bishop of Roman Catholic Diocese of Sindhudurg on 5 July 2005 and ordained on 5 Oct 2005 by Pedro López Quintana. Before becoming a bishop he has served as the dean in the Roman Catholic Diocese of Poona. He chairs the Youth Commission in Western Regions Bishops Conference.

See also
 Catholic Church in India

References

1952 births
Living people
People from Goa
21st-century Roman Catholic bishops in India